Jost Stollmann is a German-Australian business man and the previous CEO of Tyro Payments.

Born in 1955, Jost Stollmann founded German IT company  in 1984 which he sold to General Electric in 1996 by when it had grown to 3,000 employees.

In 1998, Jost was the shadow minister for economy in the German opposition for the Social Democratic Party.

From 1999 to 2001, Jost undertook a world-circumnavigation together with his wife and five children.

From 2004 to 2016, Jost was the CEO of Tyro Payments.

In July 2017, Jost retired as an executive director and became a non-executive director.

References

1955 births
Living people
German business executives